Andy Sheppard (born 1972) is a Canadian broadcaster and musician. He was the host of the defunct CBC Radio 2's nightly jazz program After Hours and currently produces and is a regular guest host of the contemporary music program The Signal for CBC Radio 2.

Sheppard was born in Simcoe, Ontario, Canada. A graduate of McGill University's music program, Sheppard is also a guitarist, composer, experimental artist, and songwriter. His song "Until Next Time" was named the winner of the 2006 Colleen Peterson Songwriting Award. His song "And The Bells They Rang" was featured in the viral video Shit Girls Say and his piece "The Things You Want (and The Things You Need)" was featured in a promotional film for the Tony Hawk Ride Channel.

Discography
 Eclectic Guitar (1995)
 Swimming In (1999)
 Andy Sheppard (2006)
 Live at SMASH! (2008)
 Find The Others (2011)

References

External links
 Andy Sheppard
 Find The Others
 Find The Others artist page at CBC Music

Date of birth missing (living people)
1972 births
Living people
People from Norfolk County, Ontario
McGill University School of Music alumni
Canadian folk guitarists
Canadian male guitarists
Canadian jazz guitarists
Canadian songwriters
Musicians from Ontario
CBC Radio hosts
21st-century Canadian guitarists
20th-century Canadian guitarists
20th-century Canadian male musicians
21st-century Canadian male musicians
Canadian male jazz musicians